Arthur Charles Forbes  (1866–7 November 1950) was an English forestry expert. 
He was a lecturer at Armstrong College of Science in Newcastle upon Tyne and, later, emigrating to Ireland in 1905 to enter the Irish Forestry Department, later becoming thehe first Director of Forestry in the Republic of Ireland, holding that position until his retirement in 1931. During World War I he held the position of Timber Controller, for which he was appointed an OBE in 1920.

Forbes was born in Burnham, Buckinghamshire, the son of John Malcolm Forbers, a forester and farm bailiff, and died in Killiney, Ireland on 7 November 1950.

Works
1904 English estate forestry London, E. Arnold 
1910 The development of British forestry London, E. Arnold

References

External links
 

English botanists
1866 births
1950 deaths
English foresters